The Old Neighborhood: What We Lost in the Great Suburban Migration: 1966-1999 is a 1999 non-fiction book by Ray Suarez. It describes the process of urban flight, as it has occurred in the United States from the 1960s to the 1990s.

References

External links
Goodreads.com
KQED interview with Suarez on The Old Neighborhood, April 30, 1999, C-SPAN

1999 non-fiction books
Books about the United States
Books about race and ethnicity
Books about cultural geography
Works about suburbs
Free Press (publisher) books